"Prinsessoja ja astronautteja" (English: Princesses and astronauts) is the debut single by Finnish singer-songwriter Sanni. It was released on  4 April 2013 through Warner Music Finland as the lead single of her debut studio album Sotke mut. The song was composed by Sanni and Hank Solo, while its lyrics were written by Sanni and it was produced by Solo.

Charts

Weekly charts

References

2013 songs
2013 debut singles
Sanni (singer) songs
Warner Music Group singles